William Ofori Atta (10 October 1910 – 14 July 1988), popularly called "Paa Willie", was a founding member of the United Gold Coast Convention (UGCC) and one of the founding fathers of Ghana, as one of "The Big Six" detained by the British colonial government in the then Gold Coast. He later became a Minister for Foreign Affairs in Ghana's second republic between 1971 and 1972.

Early life
Nana William Ofori Atta was the son of Nana Sir Ofori Atta I who was the Omanhene (King) of Akyem Abuakwa between 1912 and 1943. He was thus a nobleman of royal lineage of the Ofori-Atta dynasty, although the fact that the Akan people (to which he belonged) are traditionally matrilineal meant that he was not a dynastic prince. William Ofori Atta attended Mfantsipim School, but was withdrawn to Achimota School where he was among the first batch of students to sit for the Cambridge School Certificate. Some of his school mates included Komla Agbeli Gbedemah and Edward Akufo-Addo. His batch of students also pioneered the intermediate degree programs. He was also the first ever school prefect of the School. This arrangements went on to form the nucleus of the University of Ghana. He attended Queens' College, University of Cambridge from 1935 to 1938. He became a lawyer in 1956. His sister was Susan Ofori-Atta, the first Ghanaian woman to become a physician.

Politics
William Ofori Atta was a founding member of the United Gold Coast Convention after joining in 1947. He won one of the Akim Abuakwa seats during the 1951 Gold Coast election. He later became the leader of the United Party in opposition to Dr Kwame Nkrumah. Ofori Atta was detained by Nkrumah during the first republic under the Preventive Detention Act. During the second republic, he represented the people of Akwatia as a member of the 1st Parliament of the Second Republic, he was also the Minister for Education and then Minister for Foreign Affairs in the Progress Party government of Dr. Busia.
He was an active member of the People's Movement for Freedom and Justice (PMFJ) which campaigned against the 'Union Government' concept by General I. K. Acheampong, then Head of state of Ghana and Chairman of the Supreme Military Council (SMC). This was an attempt by the military regime to extend military rule instead of handing back power to civilians. After the fall of the SMC, he stood for president in the 1979 Ghanaian presidential election on the ticket of the United National Convention coming third with 17.41% of the popular vote. Eventually, he became chairman of the Council of State for the Third Republic.

Later life
William Ofori Atta became a devout Christian and played various roles in Christian circles. He was one of the founders of the Accra Chapel Trust, (now the Korle-Bu Community Chapel) an independent evangelical church at the Korle Bu Teaching Hospital in Accra in 1967.
Ofori Atta delivered the J. B. Danquah Memorial Lectures organised by the Ghana Academy of Arts and Sciences in 1985. His topic was – "Ghana, A Nation in Crisis". He died in 1988 and was given a state burial.

William Ofori-Atta Memorial Lectures
The William Ofori-Atta Memorial Lectures were instituted in his memory after his death.

Literature
Sawyer, Harry, William Ofori Atta, Harry Sawyer, 1979

Ghana, a Nation in Crisis

The vision of an independent State of Ghana

See also
The Big Six
Minister for Foreign Affairs (Ghana)
United Gold Coast Convention

Notes

Publications

1910 births
1988 deaths
Ghanaian MPs 1951–1954
Akan people
Alumni of Queens' College, Cambridge
Alumni of the University of Cambridge
20th-century Ghanaian lawyers
Ghanaian MPs 1969–1972
Ghanaian Presbyterians
Alumni of Achimota School
Mfantsipim School alumni
Culture ministers of Ghana
Education ministers of Ghana
Foreign ministers of Ghana
Sports ministers of Ghana
United Party (Ghana) politicians
Progress Party (Ghana) politicians
United National Convention politicians
United Gold Coast Convention politicians
Candidates for President of Ghana
William
University of Ghana alumni
Ghanaian independence activists